MFH may refer to:

Malignant fibrous histiocytoma
Master of Foxhounds
Missouri Foundation for Health
Multi-family housing
Mesquite Airport IATA code